= Alexander Egger =

Italian artist

Alexander Egger (born in 1971) is an Italian graphic designer, conceptionist, artist, writer and musician. He is working in different media on a range of cultural and commercial projects. Currently he is currently living and working in Vienna.

== Publications ==
- Satellites Mistaken for Stars, Monograph, Gingko Press (California, USA)
- People who make noise are dangerous, Zine, Independent Publication (Vienna, Austria)
- Places to go, people to see, things to do, Zine, Independent Publication (Vienna, Austria)
- Many people would never fall in love if they didn't hear so much about it, Zine, Independent Publication (Vienna, Austria)
- In the Long Term We are All Dead, Zine, Independent Publication (Vienna, Austria)
- Sex Is Nostalgia for Sex When Once It Was Exciting, Zine, Independent Publication (Vienna, Austria)
- But the sun likes me, Zine, (Vienna, Austria)
- Why can you smile while you talk bullshit, Zine, (Vienna, Austria)
- Buildings, not homes, Zine, (Vienna, Austria)
- 1984 was an extremely boring year, Zine, (Vienna, Austria)

=== Music ===
- Waiting For J.: A Bluffers Guide to Pop, Several live plays in the Basement Room, Vienna
- Several fieldrecordings: 2000-2007
- The day I have been nowhere/everywhere, Recording project on cassette tapes (ongoing)
